Neyder Yessy Lozano Rentería (born 4 March 1994) is a Colombian professional footballer who plays as a central defender for Spanish club CF Talavera de la Reina, on loan from CD Lugo.

Club career
Born in Quibdó, Lozano moved to Spain in December 2012, aged 18. After finishing his training with CDA San Marcelino, he joined UD San Sebastián de los Reyes, being initially assigned to the reserves in the regional leagues.

Lozano made his first team debut for SS Reyes on 5 March 2017, coming on as a late substitute and being sent off in a 0–0 Segunda División B away draw against Barakaldo CF. He subsequently became a regular starter, and was definitively promoted to the main squad before the 2017–18 season.

On 31 January 2018, Lozano joined fellow third division team Elche CF. He immediately became a starter, contributing with 20 appearances (play-offs included) as his side achieved promotion to Segunda División.

Lozano made his professional debut on 18 August 2018, starting in a 0–0 home draw against Granada CF. He scored his first professional goal on 19 October, netting the opener in a 2–0 home defeat of Málaga CF.

On 1 July 2019, free agent Lozano signed a three-year contract with Granada CF, newly promoted to La Liga. He fractured his tibia shortly after arriving, and remained sidelined for more than two years after failing to recover completely.

In July 2022, after his contract with Granada expired, Lozano went on a trial at CD Lugo, and signed a two-year contract with the club on 22 July. The following 30 January, however, he was loaned to Primera Federación side CF Talavera de la Reina.

Career statistics

Club

References

External links

1994 births
Living people
People from Quibdó
Colombian footballers
Association football defenders
Segunda División players
Segunda División B players
Tercera División players
Divisiones Regionales de Fútbol players
UD San Sebastián de los Reyes players
Elche CF players
Granada CF footballers
CD Lugo players
CF Talavera de la Reina players
Colombian expatriate footballers
Colombian expatriate sportspeople in Spain
Expatriate footballers in Spain
Members of the Church of God Ministry of Jesus Christ International
Sportspeople from Chocó Department